Jar Jar Binks is a fictional character of the Gungan race from the Star Wars saga created by George Lucas. Jar Jar appears throughout the Star Wars prequel trilogy – as a major character in Episode I: The Phantom Menace, with a smaller role in Episode II: Attack of the Clones, and with only a one-line cameo in Episode III: Revenge of the Sith – as well as having a role in the television series Star Wars: The Clone Wars. The first fully computer-generated supporting character in a live-action film, he has been voiced by Ahmed Best in most of his appearances, who also acted out the character with prosthetics prior to the CGI work. The last mention of Binks is in the 2017 canonical novel Aftermath: Empire's End.

Jar Jar's primary role in Episode I was to provide comic relief for the audience. He was met with overwhelming dislike from both critics and audiences, and has been recognized as one of the most hated characters in Star Wars and the history of film in general, with some commentators arguing that the character was based on stereotypes of African Americans. The hate affected Best personally, who rejected the idea that the character was based on racist stereotypes.

Part of the perception of the character changed in 2015, when a fan theory originating from Reddit gained popularity and was encouraged by Best. The theory stated that Jar Jar was originally intended to be a manipulative villain, but George Lucas replaced him in Episode II at the last minute with Count Dooku because of Jar Jar's unpopularity. Best would later confirm that this was partially true, as he felt it would have happened without the backlash.

Conception 
George Lucas was inspired to develop Jar Jar based on the Disney character Goofy. Singer Michael Jackson wanted to play the role, but wished to portray the character using prosthetics while Lucas wanted him to be all CGI. Ahmed Best was cast based on his work in the production of Stomp, as Lucas wanted someone athletic for the role. During his audition he performed several martial arts moves and flips, which according to Best was a contrast to how Lucas pictured the character, more in line with comedic silent actors such as Buster Keaton. After Lucas walked out of the audition, Best felt he had failed it. Terryl Whitlatch created the final designs for the "cowardly and insecure" character.

Best wore a prosthetic costume to portray Jar Jar, which cost about $100,000 and served as a reference for the actors to interact with, animators to base the performance on, and digital artists to match the lighting. He was the first computer-generated supporting character in a live-action film, although in a small number of shots (such as those only showing the character's hands or feet), the costume was not replaced with CGI.

Appearances

Films 

Jar Jar appears only in the prequel trilogy.

The Phantom Menace
Jar Jar Binks first appears in Star Wars: Episode I – The Phantom Menace as a bumbling, foolish Gungan from the planet Naboo who is banished by his tribe as punishment for his clumsiness. He is nearly killed by a Trade Federation transport, only to be saved at the last minute by Jedi Master Qui-Gon Jinn (Liam Neeson). Qui-Gon and his padawan, Obi-Wan Kenobi (Ewan McGregor), persuade Jar Jar's tribe to release him to their custody as a guide. He later goes with the Jedi and Padmé Amidala (Natalie Portman) to the planet Tatooine, where he meets and befriends nine-year-old slave Anakin Skywalker (Jake Lloyd).

Jar Jar later appears in the film's climactic battle scene, where he leads his fellow Gungans, as a general in the Gungan army, in defeating the Trade Federation. After the battle, he appears at the funeral of Qui-Gon Jinn and in the ending parade with his fellow Gungans.

Attack of the Clones
Jar Jar's role in Attack of the Clones is much smaller, but his actions are significant. Ten years after helping save his planet, he is a delegate to the Galactic Senate and as such, plays a role in bringing his old friends, Obi-Wan and Anakin (Hayden Christensen), back to Coruscant, where he greets them with enthusiasm. Later, on the behalf of the Naboo, he gives a speech to the assembled Senate in favor of granting Chancellor Palpatine (Ian McDiarmid) vast emergency powers.

Revenge of the Sith
Jar Jar appears in only a few scenes in Revenge of the Sith, and has no dialogue (besides a brief "'scuse me" at one point). He was originally given some dialogue in the beginning, but this was cut. Another cut scene would have shown Palpatine mocking Jar Jar for putting him in power before crowning himself emperor. He is most prominently featured in Padmé Amidala's funeral procession at the end of the film, marching sadly behind her coffin alongside Boss Nass.

The Clone Wars television series 
Jar Jar Binks is a supporting character in the animated series Star Wars: The Clone Wars, once again voiced by Best, although Phil LaMarr voiced the character in three season one episodes under the pseudonym BJ Hughes. In this series, he is a Senate representative who sometimes accompanies the main characters—Anakin, Obi-Wan, Padmé, and Anakin's padawan Ahsoka Tano—on their adventures. He and Jedi Master Mace Windu are the two main characters of the two-part episode "The Disappeared" in which they had to search for missing elders and rescue a queen, who was Jar Jar's past love interest.

List of appearances The Clone Wars 

 Season 1 Episode 08 "Bombad Jedi"
 Season 1 Episode 11 "Dooku Captured"
 Season 1 Episode 12 "The Gungan General"
 Season 1 Episode 17 "Blue Shadow Virus"
 Season 1 Episode 18 "Mystery of a Thousand Moons"
 Season 2 Episode 04 "Senate Spy"
 Season 3 Episode 03 "Supply Lines"
 Season 4 Episode 02 "Gungan Attack"
 Season 4 Episode 03 "Prisoners"
 Season 4 Episode 04 "Shadow Warrior"
 Season 4 Episode 15 "Deception"
 Season 6 Episode 08 "The Disappeared, Part I"
 Season 6 Episode 09 "The Disappeared, Part II"

Literature

Aftermath: Empire's End
Chuck Wendig's 2017 novel Star Wars: Aftermath: Empire's End, set after the events of Return of the Jedi, finds Binks as a street performer who entertains refugee children but is loathed by adults who blame him for his part in the rise of the Empire. Chris Taylor of Mashable wrote that the situation reflects real life in that adults disliked Jar Jar in the prequel films, but children were entertained by him.

In an interview, director J. J. Abrams suggested that Jar Jar's death might be referenced in Star Wars: The Force Awakens, but this did not happen.

Legends
With the 2012 acquisition of Lucasfilm by The Walt Disney Company, most of the licensed Star Wars novels and comics produced since the originating 1977 film Star Wars were rebranded as Star Wars Legends and declared non-canon to the franchise in April 2014.

In the game Star Wars: The Force Unleashed, Jar Jar is shown to have been frozen in carbonite by an Imperial officer and kept in his trophy room.

Other appearances
Binks is a Lego mini-figure in the Lego Star Wars video games, and appears as an Angry Bird with a hook move called "Jar Jar Wings" in Angry Birds Star Wars II. Ahmed Best was signed on to portray Binks in the show Star Wars Detours.

Reception
Even before the release of The Phantom Menace, Jar Jar Binks became the subject of significant media and popular attention. After the film's release, Binks became symbolic of what many reviewers such as Brent Staples (The New York Times), David Edelstein (Slate), and Eric Harrison (Los Angeles Times) considered to be creative flaws of the film. The character was widely rejected and often ridiculed by people who felt that Jar Jar was included in the film solely to appeal to children (a criticism first leveled with the introduction of the Ewoks in Return of the Jedi). Bruce Handy of Vanity Fair wrote that "Jar Jar has come to symbolize what many fans see as the faults of the prequel trilogy: characters no one much cares about; a sense of humor geared toward the youngest conceivable audience members; an over-reliance on computer graphics; and story lines devoted to the kinds of convoluted political machinations which wouldn’t have been out of place in adaptations of I, Claudius or The Rise and Fall of the Third Reich, but which fit less snugly in films with characters like Jar Jar Binks." One fan, Mike J. Nichols, created and distributed, free of charge, a modified version of the film, entitled The Phantom Edit, which cut out several scenes featuring what Nichols dubbed 'Jar Jar antics.' The character was also lampooned on an episode of the television show South Park entitled "Jakovasaurs", in The Fairly OddParents (Episode: "Abra-Catastrophe!"), The Simpsons (Episode: "Co-Dependents' Day"), as well as the parody Star Wars episodes of Robot Chicken, in which Best reprised the role in voice-over form.

In response to the criticism surrounding Jar Jar, Star Wars creator George Lucas stated that he feels there is a section of the fanbase upset that "the movies are for children but they don't want to admit that... There is a small group of fans that do not like comic sidekicks. They want the films to be tough like The Terminator, and they get very upset and opinionated about anything that has anything to do with being childlike."

In July 2018, Best said that the widespread criticism of his character had led to him considering suicide.

In April 2019, during the annual Star Wars Celebration event ahead of the 20th anniversary panel for The Phantom Menace, George Lucas named Jar Jar as his favorite Star Wars character.

Allegations of racial caricature

In an article for the The Wall Street Journal, film critic Joe Morgenstern described the character as a "Rastafarian Stepin Fetchit on platform hoofs, crossed annoyingly with Butterfly McQueen." Legal scholar Patricia J. Williams argued that many aspects of Jar Jar Bink's characterization were reminiscent of the blackface archetypes in minstrel shows, while academic Paul J. Ford suggested the character is a "laid-back clown character" which utilized stereotypes of Afro-Caribbean people. Lucasfilm responded to these claims by denying that there were any racist intentions during the character's creation. Ahmed Best also rejected such claims, stating that "Jar Jar has nothing to do with the Caribbean".

Speculations of villainy
In late October 2015, a Reddit user by the name of "Lumpawarroo" published a detailed theory speculating that Binks was originally written as a major antagonist of the series, a manipulative, prominent collaborator of Palpatine, before being written off from his major villain's role due to the character's negative reception. This theory was related to an earlier interview with actor Ahmed Best in /r/IAmA, where he claimed that Jar Jar had been displaced from the story's main focus due to the backlash, implying at the same time that the hate received by the character was not entirely unintentional.

The post quickly became popular and received significant media coverage internationally by independent bloggers and major news outlets like The Guardian, The Washington Post, and The New York Times, which included analysis of his actions in The Phantom Menace and gave him the nickname of "Darth Jar Jar". Journalist Andrew Street from The Guardian called it a "classic twist", comparing it to Yoda's role in The Empire Strikes Back, while Matt Hickey from Forbes went to the extent of contacting George Lucas about the question, but received no answer.

In response to the speculations, Best tweeted, "I will say this, it feels really good when the hidden meaning behind the work is seen. No matter how long it takes," apparently confirming the theory. Some months later, he expanded upon his tweet in a YouTube interview, stating, "there is a lot about [the theory] that is true, there are some things about it that are not true... Could Jar Jar have evolved into that? I think the answer is yes. Because of the backlash, and rightfully so, Lucasfilm backed off of Jar Jar a lot, but a lot of the influence that I put into the character mirrored a lot of what was already in the Star Wars universe." Best concluded only Lucas could unveil the actual role of Binks, yet he also claimed that a deleted scene from Attack of the Clones would have still shown Palpatine darkly confiding his plans about the Empire to Jar Jar.

J. J. Abrams, who directed two installments of the franchise's sequel trilogy after its buyout by Disney, personally approved the theory about the villainous Jar Jar. He described Lumpawarroo's argumentation as an "unbelievably lengthy analysis, in a very seriously thought-out way, as to why it's obviously true he's [evil]."

References
Footnotes

Citations

External links

 Jar Jar Binks quotes from IMDb
 
 
 Collection of negative Jar Jar comments from major media sources.
 

Characters created by George Lucas
Fantasy television characters
Fictional amphibians
Film characters introduced in 1999
Fictional diplomats
Fictional generals
Fictional extraterrestrial humanoids
Fictional military personnel in films
Fictional senators
Film sidekicks
Male characters in film
Male characters in television
Star Wars animated characters
Star Wars Skywalker Saga characters
Star Wars: The Clone Wars characters
Race-related controversies in film